Scott Marshall (born January 17, 1969) is an American film director.

Early life 
Marshall was born and raised in Los Angeles, the son of Barbara Wells, a nurse, and Garry Marshall; he is also the nephew of Penny Marshall. Scott had an interest in film since his childhood as his father recalled of his son's early efforts in film, "I'd make him a little wooden airplane and he would take it immediately and burn it, and start to film it, flaming, crashing!". Also, "Later, we got a pool and he would get his friends to drink tomato juice and then he'd shoot at them and they would dive in the pool and the tomato juice would come out. It ruined the pool."

Career 
Marshall studied film directing at the AFI Conservatory where he directed his short film Waving Not Drowning. It later screened at the AFI/Los Angeles Film Festival. He also directed the movie Blonde Ambition, which is considered a cult film by some for its writing and for the many references it has.

He also played bass guitar in Chavez.

Personal life 
Marshall's wife is named Elissa. They have three children: Sam, Ethan, and Emma.

Director 
 Keeping Up with the Steins (2006)
 Blonde Ambition (2007)
 All's Faire in Love (2009)

Second unit director 
(all with father Garry, except where noted)

 The Princess Diaries 2: Royal Engagement
 The Princess Diaries
 Runaway Bride
 Dear God
 The Preacher's Wife (with Penny Marshall)
 Raising Helen
 The Other Sister
 Mother's Day

References

External links 
 
 Marshall Arts Productions

1969 births
American rock bass guitarists
American people of Italian descent
American people of English descent
American people of German descent
American people of Scottish descent
Chavez (band) members
Film directors from Los Angeles
Living people